Malala is a village in the Diu district and Union Territory of Daman and Diu, India.

References 

Villages in Diu district